Toonami is an American late night television programming block that primarily broadcasts Japanese anime and occasionally American action animation. It was created by Sean Akins and Jason DeMarco and produced by Williams Street, a division of Warner Bros. Television Studios, and owned by The Cartoon Network, Inc. subsidiary of Warner Bros. Discovery. The name is a portmanteau of the words "cartoon" and "tsunami". It currently broadcasts every Saturday night from 12 am. to 3 a.m, but the schedule commonly shifts after a few weeks. ET/PT.

Toonami initially ran as a weekday afternoon block on Cartoon Network from 1997 until 2004, when it transitioned into a Saturday evening format until its final airing four years later. Cartoon Network's block was primarily aimed at children and teens aged 9–15. In its original run from 1997 to 2008, the block was known for showcasing action-oriented animation, with heavy focus on Japanese animation, which became widely popular with American audiences. Toonami is recognized for its distinctive space-themed backdrop, anime music videos, drum and bass-flavored soundtrack, and its robot host named T.O.M. (short for Toonami Operations Module).

On May 26, 2012, Toonami was relaunched as a late night block on Adult Swim. The current incarnation is a rebrand of Adult Swim's Saturday night action block (itself inherited from Toonami's Midnight Run block), which primarily aired anime.

Broadcast history

Cartoon Network (1997–2008)

1997–1999: Moltar era 
Toonami was Cartoon Network's primary action-animation block. The block premiered on March 17, 1997, with ThunderCats, Cartoon Roulette, Voltron, another episode of Roulette, and The Real Adventures of Jonny Quest respectively as its first programs. It initially replaced Power Zone, Cartoon Network's most recent incarnation of the Super Adventures block, which had been a staple on the network since its debut on October 1, 1992. Toonami was originally a weekday afternoon cartoon and action block hosted by Space Ghost villain-turned-producer Moltar (voiced by C. Martin Croker) at the Ghost Planet Industries building from March 17, 1997, to July 10, 1999.

1999–2000: T.O.M. 1 era 
On July 13, 1999, Cartoon Network retired previous host Moltar and relaunched Toonami with a new environment, the Ghost Planet Spaceship Absolution, and a new host, a robot named T.O.M. (voiced by Sonny Strait), which introduced viewers to him with this speech:

Soon afterwards, the first program of the T.O.M. era, the Sailor Moon episode "Sailor Mercury Moving On?", premiered. It introduced The Powerpuff Girls on Toonami, becoming the first Cartoon Network original series on the block. Also introduced that day was the Midnight Run, a late night block. It was originally a five-hour Saturday night block (technically Sunday) at midnight EST until March 2000, when it moved to weeknights in an hour-long format until January 2003. It consisted of anime such as Dragon Ball Z, Sailor Moon, Voltron, Robotech, Mobile Suit Gundam Wing, The Big O, and Outlaw Star. Midnight Run tended to have more blood and violence than its daytime counterpart, even running an uncut version of Gundam Wing between March and November 2000. One special edition that started on Friday, August 31, 2001, featured music videos such as “Clint Eastwood” by Gorillaz, and songs by Daft Punk from their 2001 album Discovery, the music videos of which constitute the 2003 Japanese-French musical Interstella 5555, and Kenna's "Hellbent”. Another event was Dragon Ball Z taking over the Midnight Run for a week starting on March 26–30, 1999.

A Saturday morning incarnation, Toonami Rising Sun, ran from 2000 to 2001 at 9:00 am to noon. It later ran from 10:00 am to 1:00 pm, then 11:00 am to 1:00 pm. This block was somewhat hampered to avoid competing with sister network Kids' WB.

Starting in September 2000, Toonami presented special interactive events known as Total Immersion Events (TIEs). These TIEs took place both on-air during Toonami and online at the official site, Toonami.com, and always occurred the week that the block's most popular series, Dragon Ball Z, returned for a new season. The first TIE was The Intruder, which introduced T.O.M.'s companion, an AI matrix known as Sara (voiced by Sally Timms, singer for the British band The Mekons) The Intruder was an eight episode mini-series that aired during Toonami from September 18 to October 22, 2000. It involved the Absolution being attacked by an alien blob known only as "the Intruder", which ultimately devoured T.O.M.

2000–2002: T.O.M. 2 era 

Though The Intruder resulted in the destruction of T.O.M., he was soon after upgraded by S.A.R.A. from a short Bomberman-esque character to a taller, sleeker, deeper-voiced incarnation dubbed T.O.M. 2 (voiced by Steve Blum, who has since been the voice of all subsequent incarnations of the character).

From July 30, 2001, until June 28, 2002, Kids' WB (also owned by Time Warner) aired a Toonami block that was, more or less, the Kids' WB lineup with the Toonami name. Although Toonami on Kids' WB brought over shows such as Sailor Moon, Dragon Ball Z, and The Powerpuff Girls to broadcast television, it was critically panned by industry observers, who noticed that the action branding of the block - which had added shows such as Generation O!, Scooby-Doo, and The Nightmare Room, a live-action series created by Goosebumps author R. L. Stine - did not translate content-wise. And while the cross promotion between Cartoon Network and Kids' WB did allow for series to be shared between the networks, most of these only lasted a short period of time. This included Dragon Ball Z and Sailor Moon appearing on Toonami on Kids' WB for only two weeks, and Cardcaptors appearing on the main Toonami block on Cartoon Network for only two weeks. In spring 2002, Kids' WB announced that they would drop the Toonami name from their weekday lineup, once again making the Toonami brand exclusive to Cartoon Network.

The TIE, Lockdown, aired between September 17–21, 2001, and included the introduction of CartoonNetwork.com's first MMORPG, as well as a record-breaking amount of page views and ratings for the network. In Lockdown T.O.M. fights to save the Absolution from an attack by a giant trash compactor. Trapped in Hyperspace, the next TIE, ran the week of September 16–20, 2002. Sara gets taken offline by a computer virus named Swayzak (whose voice actor is unknown but is speculated to be Khary Payton), and TOM is trapped in hyperspace. He manages to defeat Swayzak before the Absolution hits Earth. The game tie-in for this event is lost.

During the week of February 24–28, 2003, Cartoon Network aired on Toonami "Giant Robot Week," a five-day special based on mecha series, which were licensed by A.D. Vision.  The series shown were Neon Genesis Evangelion, Gigantor, Robotech, Martian Successor Nadesico, and Dai-Guard.

On May 15, 2001, Cartoon Network released Toonami: Deep Space Bass, the official soundtrack album to the TV block.

2003–2007: T.O.M. 3 era 
In March 2003, TOM was revamped into a more muscular figure. This was explained in-universe as him being rebuilt after fighting a space pirate named Orcelot Rex in the comic Endgame. His voice also became more humanlike.

In September 2003, a mini series premiered introducing a new, 2D universe. Immortal Grand Prix (IGPX), created by Toonami producers Sean Akins and Jason DeMarco, and produced by anime studio Production I.G, aired in five short installments, serving as a pilot for the second Toonami original series, which premiered in November 2005.

On April 17, 2004, Toonami was moved from weekday afternoons to a Saturday evening slot, where it aired regularly for four hours starting at 7:00 pm EST. A new lighter-toned action block, Miguzi, premiered two weekdays in its place. Toonami also replaced the block known as Saturday Video Entertainment System (SVES).  One reason for the move from weekdays to Saturday nights was because some of the shows on the weekday lineup became too violent for a weekday broadcast on the network. The new Toonami lineup showcased anime such as Naruto, Rave Master, Duel Masters, Mobile Suit Gundam SEED, One Piece, Bobobo-bo Bo-bobo, Zatch Bell, and Pokémon Chronicles, as well as premiered North American productions including Teen Titans, Megas XLR, The Batman (TV series), Justice League Unlimited, and IGPX, Toonami's first and only original production co-produced by Production I.G and Bandai Entertainment. Sara got a full body during this period, and became more anime-esque, along with her voice actress being changed to British actress and Red Dwarf star Samantha Robson.

Although Megas XLR was the first original American-made franchise to actually debut on the block, it was initially a Cartoon Network original that was planned to air on Friday nights.  Other Cartoon Network action properties, namely Samurai Jack, Teen Titans, and Justice League, aired on Toonami, but were not exclusive to the block until their final seasons.

2007–2008: T.O.M. 4 era and cancellation 
On January 27, 2007, a teaser commercial aired during the Xiaolin Showdown marathon on Cartoon Network, featuring closeup shots of larger Clydes (the remote robot explorers that have been a fixture of Toonami since the beginning) and two new robot A.I's along with the date "3/17/07" and T.O.M.'s chest emblem glowing blue. On March 17, Toonami celebrated its 10th anniversary with a new packaging and numerous montages celebrating the block. T.O.M. was revamped into a shorter robot with more humanoid facial features who was a commander of a jungle control room and aided by two new robots, Flash (Dave Wittenberg) and D (Tom Kenny). The montages included a look at past hosts, former logos, and a decade's worth of clips and voice-overs from shows that aired on Toonami. There were a total of four montages, each with different clips, and three were one minute long.

As part of the anniversary (and to coincide with Cartoon Network's March Movie Madness event), Toonami planned another month of movies:
 March 3 – The Invincible Iron Man
 March 10 – Mosaic
 March 17 – Hellboy: Blood and Iron
 March 24 – Stan Lee Presents: The Condor
 March 31 – Spirited Away and Teen Titans: Trouble in Tokyo

On September 20, 2008, at the Anime Weekend Atlanta convention in Atlanta, Georgia, Cartoon Network announced that they had cancelled the Toonami block due to low ratings. Toonami then aired its final broadcast later that same evening. The final show to air on the block was a rerun of Samurai Jack at 10:30 PM. Employees who worked on the block moved to other parts of the channel, except for Dennis Moloney, who left Turner to work for Disney. Toonami Jetstream remained with the Toonami name until January 30, 2009. At the end of Toonami's final airing, T.O.M. 4 ended the block with a brief, final monologue, backed by the song "Cascade" by Tycho:

After Toonami's final episode on TV, Toonami Jetstream's subsequent shut down in 2009 marked the end of this incarnation until the brand's revival in 2012.

Adult Swim (2012–present)

2012–2013: T.O.M. 3.5 era 
On April 1, 2012, Adult Swim aired the Toonami block for their annual April Fools' Day prank, in which would be the annual airing of The Room. After airing that week's scheduled episode of Bleach, the Toonami-related programming continued throughout the night, featuring shows such as Dragon Ball Z, Mobile Suit Gundam Wing, Tenchi Muyo!, Outlaw Star, The Big O, YuYu Hakusho, Blue Submarine No. 6, Trigun, Astro Boy (1963), and Gigantor. The following day, Adult Swim posted a message to their Twitter page, simply stating, "Want it back? Let us know. #BringBackToonami". On April 4, Adult Swim followed up this tweet with one stating, "#BringBackToonami We've heard you. Thank you for your passion and interest - stay tuned." On April 8, Adult Swim aired two bumpers about the Toonami tweets and answered with "[we're listening]" and "[we're looking into it]".

On May 16, Adult Swim posted a message on Facebook announcing that Toonami would return on May 26. The network issued a press release later that day confirming the block's revival as a Saturday late-night action block. Toonami made its return on May 26, with an initial lineup consisting of current Adult Swim Action programs, along with premieres of Deadman Wonderland and Casshern Sins. On August 18, Samurai 7 and Eureka Seven replaced Deadman Wonderland and Cowboy Bebop. In essence, the revived block is very similar to the Midnight Run of the original, airing uncut programming as well as having more mature themes.

On October 6, Toonami expanded to a full six hours; Sym-Bionic Titan and ThunderCats were added to the block. Tenchi Muyo! GXP was announced as the next premiere on November 3, as was the return of Inuyasha. On November 22, Toonami announced they would air uncut episodes of Naruto, and confirmed that Bleach would enter reruns for eight weeks, beginning on December 1.

On January 6, 2013, Toonami introduced a new blue color scheme, after using a similar scheme to introduce Inuyasha on November 3 of the previous year. New episodes of Bleach began on January 26.  On February 16, Soul Eater began airing on Toonami, replacing Samurai 7. During MomoCon, new designs for both T.O.M and the Absolution were unveiled, along with the announcement that overall design of the block would be changed.

2013–2019: T.O.M. 5 era 
On April 27, 2013, Toonami premiered its new look, featuring the return of supporting host Sara (now voiced by Adult Swim staff member Dana Swanson.) To kick off 2014, Toonami premiered the anime Space Dandy on January 4, even before Japan. The anime ran for two seasons and 26 episodes before ending that September. The block introduced a new aesthetic on April 6. This new look also featured the return of the Ninja Tune record label to Toonami. Intruder II, the first Total Immersion Event since Toonami's 2012 revival, began on November 7 and concluded on December 20, 2015, with Sonny Strait reprising his role as The Intruder with Steve Blum, who also is The Intruder and TOM 5. On December 2, Adult Swim announced that a new season of Samurai Jack was being produced. It ended up premiering on Toonami in March 2017. The conclusion of Intruder III in 2016 led to another new look to Toonami.

On December 31, 2016, Toonami aired its first subtitled anime broadcast with the music video of Porter Robinson and Madeon's Shelter, produced in collaboration with A-1 Pictures and Crunchyroll. However, the subtitled parts in both the start and end of the music video have been removed due to an unknown error. As of right now, it is unknown that the full version of the music video could air in the future.

A fifth T.I.E. titled Countdown was released from November 4 through November 25, 2017. It centers T.O.M. being sent into the future where SARA takes over the Vindication after passing through an unknown nebula while his future counterpart travels to the present to destroy the ship to prevent her from becoming evil. The event concluded with T.O.M. having scratches and minimal damage on his body.

On March 20, 2018, Production I.G. and Adult Swim announced that two new seasons of FLCL, FLCL Progressive, and FLCL Alternative would premiere on Toonami in 2018, with the date set for June 2 at 11:30PM. On April Fools' Day 2018, Toonami was entirely dubbed in Japanese and kicked the prank off by airing a preview of the first episode of FLCL Alternative in Japanese with English subtitles. The Toonami logo was also changed to Japanese (stylized as トゥナミ). Toonami followed the sneak preview by airing the film Mind Game and aired programming after that was originally scheduled after Black Clover, except Iron-Blooded Orphans, in original Japanese with English subtitles. The English dubbed version of all of the programs that have aired on that week, including a review of Nier Automata, except for the sneak preview of FLCL Alternative, as well as Mind Game and Scavengers, would air a week later. TOM was voiced by Masa Kanome, a Japanese stunt actor who had been in a Wolverine movie, and Sara was voiced by Fusako Shiotani.

On September 29, Toonami expanded to seven full hours from 9 PM to 4 AM with Boruto: Naruto Next Generations as the marquee addition. On December 13, it was announced that Toonami would remove Dragon Ball Z Kai and Samurai Jack from its lineup, cutting the block down to 6 hours. Also, the block would be moved back and would air from 11 PM-5 AM, starting on January 5, 2019, because of Adult Swim taking back the 8 PM hour from Cartoon Network.

On January 24, it was announced that Toonami would remove Pop Team Epic and Iron-Blooded Orphans from its lineup, cutting the block down to 5 hours.

On May 13, 2019, Adult Swim announced that Toonami would be shifting its whole block thirty minutes earlier, starting at 10:30 PM and ending at 3:30 AM, cutting a half-hour rerun of Family Guy. The changes began on May 25, 2019.

On May 24, 2019, MomoCon announced that a new T.I.E., The Forge, would begin airing on November 9.

On June 27, 2019, it was announced that Toonami would be shifting its whole block back at 11:00 PM and ending at 4:00 AM, in addition to premiering Food Wars!: Shokugeki no Soma at 1:00AM. The changes began on July 6, 2019. On July 4 at Anime Expo and on Facebook, it was announced that Demon Slayer: Kimetsu no Yaiba would be joining the block this Fall. On July 20, it was revealed that Fire Force would be joining the block at 1:00 AM. On July 7 at RTX 2019, it was announced that Gen:Lock would be joining the block on August 3. On August 16, it was announced that Toonami would expand 30 minutes and reshuffling its block with Dr. Stone at 12:00 AM.

2019–present: T.O.M. 6 era 

During the Total Immersion Event in November 2019, T.O.M. 5 was killed by the Forge Commander in episode 4 of The Forge. This signaled the ending of TOM 5's service as the host of Toonami's programming block, which began back in 2013. This iteration of T.O.M. was the longest running host in Toonami history.

On January 8, 2020, it was announced that Sword Art Online: Alicization – War of Underworld would premiere on the network on January 18. On January 23, it was announced that Toonami would be reducing the block to five hours, as Fire Force was ending its run; the new block aired from 11:00 PM to 4:00 AM. On February 6, it was announced that the block would lose another one and a half hours, as Dr. Stone was ending its run, while reruns of The Promised Neverland and Attack on Titan would also cease. This reduced the length of the block to three and a half hours, which aired from 11:30 PM to 3:00 AM. On April 8, it was announced that Toonami would be reduced to a three-hour block, as Sword Art Online: Alicization - War of Underworld was ending its run.
On April 15, it was announced that Paranoia Agent would premiere on April 25 and that Food Wars: Shokugeki no Soma would be removed from the block until a new agreement was struck for the next season. On June 3, it was announced that the run of JoJo's Bizarre Adventure: Golden Wind would be put on hold due to dubbing production problems associated with the COVID-19 pandemic, with the Adult Swim original series Ballmastrz: 9009 temporarily replacing it on Toonami starting on June 6.

On July 26, it was announced that JoJo's Bizarre Adventure: Golden Wind would be returning on August 1, starting with episode 29. That same day, block runner Jason DeMarco tweeted that Toonami had six original projects in total in the works, including three that were unannounced at the time. On July 28, the second season of Fire Force was confirmed with an expected air date of October 24, however it was later rescheduled to November 7. On August 4, it was announced that Toonami: Dark Knights was confirmed for DC FanDome has 4 Batman movies in two weeks, including Batman: Year One, Batman: The Dark Knight Returns Part 1, Batman: Gotham Knight and Batman: The Dark Knight Returns Part 2 with an expected air date of August 15, however it was later again on August 22. On August 22, it was announced that Assassination Classroom would premiere on August 29. On October 20, it was announced that Sword Art Online: Alicization - War of Underworld would be returning on November 7, starting with episode 39. On November 16, it was announced that Primal was confirmed as the marathon on November 28 for the entire season. On December 11, it was announced again that Toonami Wonder Woman night was confirmed for DC FanDome has the entire regularly scheduled lineup was pre-empted by back-to-back movie presentations, including Wonder Woman: Bloodlines and Justice League: The New Frontier on December 19. On December 24, 2020, it was announced that SSSS.Gridman would premiere in January 2021. On December 28, 2020, it was announced that Toonami would be increasing the block back to four hours as Attack on Titan would return on January 9, 2021.

On February 1, 2021, it was announced that Black Clover would be returning to February 13, starting with episode 137.
On February 10, 2021, it was announced that Food Wars!: The Third Plate would be returning on February 27, to replace Assassination Classroom. On March 17, 2021, it was announced that The Promised Neverland would be returning as the season two premiere on April 10. On June 8, 2021, it was announced that Yashahime: Princess Half-Demon would premiere on June 26. On July 13, 2021, it was announced that Harley Quinn was confirmed as the marathon on August 7 for the entire season. On November 10, 2021, it was announced that for one night only, Toonami would receive an extra night of programming on November 26, 2021. The lineup featured Shinichiro Watanabe's Blade Runner Black Out 2022 short, the live-action Blade Runner 2049 film, and the first three episodes of Blade Runner: Black Lotus.

On January 8, 2022, Toonami announced that they would be airing a new show every week "for the next month or so" beginning with the second season of Assassination Classroom. They later announced the arrival of Made in Abyss, return of One Piece, premiere date of Shenmue, and arrival of the second part of the fourth season of Attack on Titan. On February 2, 2022, Jason Demarco confirmed that an original series from the Cartoon Network block that would be arriving later that year and three additional series are set to arrive in 2023. On February 19, 2022, a second round of Cosmo Samurai episodes began premiering to celebrate the block's 25th anniversary. On March 13, 2022, it was announced that a new T.I.E., The Return, would air in two parts to celebrate the block's 25th anniversary. Running for two minutes each, the event saw TOM 6 and SARA v4 going to the GPS Absolution Mk. XIV, an upgraded version of the Absolution that was sent back in time from 250 years in the future, for the next graphical rebrand, and the Forge is now abandoned. On March 17, 2022, a new original series, Housing Complex C, was announced for a 2022 release and two new seasons of FLCL for 2023. On April 7, it was announced that Lupin the 3rd Part 6 would premiere on the block, replacing Made in Abyss on April 16. On May 18, it was announced that an original anime series directed by Sunghoo Park, titled Ninja Kamui, would premiere on Toonami.

Online video services

Toonami Reactor 
On March 26, 2001, Cartoon Network launched Toonami Reactor, their first online streaming video service. The three-month service featured streaming episodes from Dragon Ball Z and Star Blazers, the latter of which was an online-exclusive series. Editorial content was provided by the now-defunct Animerica Magazine, published by VIZ Media. After the three-month "trial run" was over, Cartoon Network took it offline and completely revamped it.

On November 14, 2001, Cartoon Network relaunched Toonami Reactor with all online-exclusive programs such as Star Blazers, Patlabor: The TV Series, Harlock Saga, and Record of Lodoss War, as well as videos from Daft Punk and Toonami-themed games.  In the summer of 2002, Toonami Reactor was revamped again under the Adult Swim aegis and, in a joint venture with VIZ's Weekly Shonen Jump, programmed it as "Adult Swim Pipeline." It featured episodes and/or manga chapters from One Piece, Naruto, Shaman King, Yu Yu Hakusho, and Sand Land.

Toonami Jetstream 

On April 25, 2006, Cartoon Network and VIZ Media announced plans to launch Toonami Jetstream, a new ad-supported streaming video service featuring Toonami series like Naruto, Samurai Jack, Megas XLR, and IGPX, and the Internet webcast premieres of Hikaru no Go, MÄR, Eyeshield 21, The Prince of Tennis, MegaMan Star Force, Kiba, MegaMan NT Warrior, and Zoids: Genesis, the latter two of which were never streamed.

Toonami Jetstream launched on July 17, 2006 (after a brief unofficial sneak preview that began on July 14), and offered episodes of Naruto, Hikaru no Go, MÄR, Zatch Bell!, Pokémon, Blue Dragon, Samurai Jack, Kiba, Storm Hawks and Transformers: Animated.

On January 31, 2009, Toonami Jetstream was discontinued. Since then, many of the shows aired until cancellation aired on Cartoon Network Video on its main website.

In 2012, Adult Swim rebranded their action videos section as "Toonami shows." It initially featured content from Durarara!!, which never aired on the Toonami block.

Toonami Pre-Flight 
On February 27, 2015, adultswim.com launched the online show Toonami: Pre-Flight hosted by Toonami producers Jason DeMarco and Gill Austin. The first two episodes premiered on a Friday at 5:00 p.m. Eastern time, and was then moved to Tuesday at 5:00 p.m. Eastern time until September 25, 2015, when the show was moved back to Fridays at 6:30 p.m. Eastern time. Each episode features a series highlight, a weekly topic and other featurettes like sneak peeks at promos and spots, as well as announcements, and segments from voiceover talent Steve Blum and Dana Swanson. Toonami has also done panels from MomoCon, San Diego Comic-Con, Dragon Con and Anime Expo which they've streamed as part of Pre-Flight either live or on tape delay. On November 14, 2020, Toonami: Pre-Flight aired its final episode.

Crunchyroll 
The anime-oriented streaming service company Crunchyroll became a sibling asset to Adult Swim after AT&T's acquisition of Time Warner, and its subsequent acquisition of the remaining shares in AT&T's existing venture Otter Media. In March 2019, Adult Swim and Otter were briefly placed under Warner Bros. as part of a corporate reorganization. The corresponding announcement stated that there would be synergies between Toonami and the service; the two properties had already announced a collaboration on Blade Runner: Black Lotus, an anime series set within the Blade Runner universe. In July 2020, Adult Swim and Crunchyroll announced a new anime series collaboration, titled Fena: Pirate Princess. At the virtual Crunchyroll Expo in September 2020, the two entities announced yet another collaboration titled Shenmue, an anime series based on the video game series by Sega.

Current schedule 
All times shown are Eastern. Effective as of the broadcast night of March 18, 2023.

* Indicates first-run episode premieres for the block.

Programming

Cartoon Network (1997–2008) / Kids' WB (2001–2002) 
 1997

 ThunderCats (1985 series)
 Cartoon Roulette (composed of Space Ghost, Birdman and the Galaxy Trio, The Herculoids, Mightor, Shazzan, Teen Force, The Impossibles, and the 1940s Superman cartoons)
 Voltron
 The Real Adventures of Jonny Quest

 1998

 Robotech
 Beast Wars: Transformers
 Sailor Moon
 Dragon Ball Z 
 Super Friends

 1999

 ReBoot
 The Powerpuff Girls
 Ronin Warriors

 2000

 G-Force: Guardians of Space
 Mobile Suit Gundam Wing
 Batman: The Animated Series
 Tenchi Muyo! Ryo-Ohki
 Tenchi Universe
 Tenchi in Tokyo
 Blue Submarine No. 6
 Superman: The Animated Series

 2001

 Outlaw Star
 The Big O
 Cardcaptors
 Mobile Suit Gundam
 Mobile Suit Gundam: The 08th MS Team
 Dragon Ball
 Batman Beyond
 Zoids: New Century
 Mobile Suit Gundam 0080: War in the Pocket

 2002

 Hamtaro
 Zoids: Chaotic Century
 Mobile Fighter G Gundam
 He-Man and the Masters of the Universe
 Transformers: Armada
 G.I. Joe
 Samurai Jack (original series)

 2003

 .hack//Sign
 YuYu Hakusho
 Rurouni Kenshin
 Justice League
 Cyborg 009: The Cyborg Soldier
 Superior Defender Gundam Force
 Dragon Ball GT
 Star Wars: Clone Wars

 2004

 Duel Masters
 Astro Boy
 Transformers: Energon
 Jackie Chan Adventures
 Mobile Suit Gundam SEED
 Megas XLR
 Rave Master
 Teen Titans
 Justice League Unlimited

 2005

 D.I.C.E.
 Zatch Bell!
 The Batman
 One Piece
 Transformers: Cybertron
 Yu-Gi-Oh!
 Naruto
 Bobobo-bo Bo-bobo
 Dragon Ball Z (uncut)
 IGPX: Immortal Grand Prix (television series)

 2006

 Wulin Warriors
 Pokémon Chronicles
 Fantastic Four: World's Greatest Heroes
 Pokémon: Battle Frontier
 Yu-Gi-Oh! GX
 MÄR
 The Prince of Tennis

 2007

 Mega Man Star Force
 Storm Hawks

 2008

 Bakugan Battle Brawlers
 Blue Dragon
 Ben 10: Alien Force

Adult Swim (2012–present) 
 2012

 Bleach
 Deadman Wonderland
 Casshern Sins
 Fullmetal Alchemist: Brotherhood
 Ghost in the Shell: S.A.C. 2nd GIG
 Cowboy Bebop
 Ghost in the Shell: Stand Alone Complex
 Samurai 7
 Eureka Seven
 Sym-Bionic Titan
 ThunderCats (2011 series)
 Inuyasha
 Tenchi Muyo! GXP
 Naruto (uncut)

 2013

 Soul Eater
 IGPX: Immortal Grand Prix (television series)
 One Piece (uncut)
 Sword Art Online
 The Big O II
 Star Wars: The Clone Wars
 FLCL

 2014

 Space Dandy
 Naruto: Shippuden (uncut)
 Samurai Jack (original series / Seasons 1–4)
 Blue Exorcist
 Black Lagoon
 Attack on Titan
 Beware the Batman
 Black Lagoon: The Second Barrage
 Gurren Lagann
 Hellsing Ultimate
 Dragon Ball Z Kai (uncut)
 Inuyasha: The Final Act

 2015

 Kill la Kill
 Sword Art Online II
 Michiko & Hatchin
 Akame ga Kill!
 Parasyte -the maxim-

 2016

 Samurai Champloo
 Dimension W
 Hunter × Hunter (2011 series)
 Mobile Suit Gundam: Iron-Blooded Orphans
 One-Punch Man
 JoJo's Bizarre Adventure: The Animation

 2017

 Dragon Ball Super
 Dragon Ball Z Kai: The Final Chapters
 Mobile Suit Gundam Unicorn RE:0096
 Samurai Jack (revival series / Season 5)
 Tokyo Ghoul
 Lupin the 3rd Part IV: The Italian Adventure
 Tokyo Ghoul √A
 JoJo's Bizarre Adventure: Stardust Crusaders
 Outlaw Star (HD)
 Black Clover

 2018

 My Hero Academia
 FLCL Progressive
 Pop Team Epic
 JoJo's Bizarre Adventure: Diamond Is Unbreakable
 FLCL Alternative
 Boruto: Naruto Next Generations
 Mob Psycho 100
 Megalobox

 2019

 Sword Art Online: Alicization
 The Promised Neverland
 Lupin the 3rd Part V: Misadventures in France
 Food Wars!: Shokugeki no Soma
 Mobile Suit Gundam: The Origin – Advent of the Red Comet
 Fire Force
 Gen:Lock
 Dr. Stone
 Demon Slayer: Kimetsu no Yaiba
 JoJo's Bizarre Adventure: Golden Wind

 2020

 Sword Art Online: Alicization – War of Underworld
 Paranoia Agent
 Ballmastrz: 9009
 Assassination Classroom
 Gēmusetto: Death Beat(s)
 Primal

 2021

 SSSS.Gridman
 Yashahime: Princess Half-Demon
 Harley Quinn
 Fena: Pirate Princess
 Blade Runner: Black Lotus

 2022

 Made in Abyss
 Shenmue: The Animation
 Lupin the 3rd Part 6
 Housing Complex C

 2023

 FLCL: Grunge
 FLCL: Shoegaze

 TBA

 Ninja Kamui
 Uzumaki

International 
Outside the United States, Cartoon Network aired Toonami blocks in a lot of countries such as in Australia from 2001 to 2006. In the United Kingdom, Toonami was a standalone channel from 2003 to 2007. In December 2012, Toonami was launched as a standalone channel in Asia-Pacific. Similar channels were launched in India in 2015, France in 2016 and Africa in 2017. The Southeast Asian and Indian channels have since been closed by 2018.

Australia 

The programming block was launched in 2001 in Australia as a weekend block on Cartoon Network. It aired on Saturday from 6:00 pm to 8:00 pm and on Sunday from 3:00 pm to 5:00 pm with a repeat on both nights from 11:00 pm to 1:00 am. The programming was then converted to a weekday block shortly there after. The programming was dropped from the channel in August 2006.

France 

The French version of the Toonami television channel was launched on February 11, 2016. It is operated by Turner Broadcasting System France, in France, Switzerland, Morocco, Madagascar and Mauritius.

India 

An Indian version of Toonami was first launched as a block in 2001 and was then followed by a stand-alone channel in 2015. It ceased operations on May 15, 2018.

Japan 
The Japanese version of Toonami was first launched as a programming block for Cartoon Network Japan on July 22, 2002. In contrast to its American and international counterparts, the Japanese version of Toonami aired North American action cartoons instead of anime. It ceased operations in 2008.

Latin America 
On December 2, 2002, Cartoon Network premiered the Toonami block, replacing a similarly themed block, Talisman. The weekend block of Toonami was then replaced by the premiere of Adult Swim in Latin America on October 7, 2005. In 2007, Cartoon Network cut the Toonami block completely from the channel.

The block was revived on Cartoon Network in partnership with Crunchyroll beginning on August 31, 2020. The revived Toonami block runs every weeknight from 12 a.m. to 1 a.m. local time. The block aired for the last time on August 30, 2022, as the partnership has expired after 2 years.

On April 11, 2022, Warner TV premiered a new programming block similar to Toonami, which is known as Wanimé.

Pakistan 
Toonami was launched as a programming block on Cartoon Network in Pakistan and ran from 2004 to 2013.

Southeast Asia 

A stand-alone Toonami channel was launched in Southeast Asia replacing Boomerang on December 1, 2012. Although it replaced Boomerang, the channel was relaunched in 2015 alongside Toonami. The channel shut down on March 31, 2018, making it the longest running stand alone channel out all of them, lasting 6 years.

Sub-Saharan Africa 
A Toonami television channel was launched in sub-Saharan Africa on June 1, 2017. It was available on Kwesé satellite television platform.

Following Kwesé TV's closure, Toonami was removed on November 1, 2018.

The African Toonami was relaunched on March 27, 2020, as a pop-up channel on DStv until mid-May 2020 when it was relaunched as a permanent channel on StarTimes (channel 306 satellite, 355 DTT). It was relaunched on November 2020 on TelkomONE, but it was moved to the new launch of SABC+ on November 17, 2022, in South Africa.

UK & Ireland 

Toonami was launched as a programming block on Cartoon Network in the UK and Ireland in 2001. In October 2002, it then became part of CNX, a new spin-off channel. Almost a year later, CNX was relaunched as Toonami in 2003 turning the block into a stand-alone channel. The channel shut down on May 24, 2007, replaced by a 24-hour Cartoon Network Too.

Notes

References

External links 

 
 

 
1997 establishments in Georgia (U.S. state)
2008 disestablishments in Georgia (U.S. state)
2012 establishments in Georgia (U.S. state)
Anime television
Adult Swim
Cartoon Network
Cartoon Network programming blocks
Fictional robots
Williams Street
Television channels and stations disestablished in 2008
Television channels and stations established in 2012
Television programming blocks in the United States